True Women is a 1997 American Western CBS TV miniseries based on the 1993 novel by Janice Woods Windle directed by Karen Arthur, starring Dana Delany, Annabeth Gish, Angelina Jolie, Julie Carmen, Tina Majorino and Rachael Leigh Cook. It was filmed in Austin, San Antonio, and McDade, Texas. The series covers five decades, from the Texas Revolution through Native American uprisings and the Civil War to the early stages of the women's suffrage movement. This miniseries was first aired on the CBS television network over two nights during May 1997.

Plot summary
The story starts with young Euphemia Texas Ashby (Tina Majorino) and her older sister Sara McClure (Dana Delany). When Euphemia gets back to the house from picking flowers she finds out that Sam Houston is coming to the house. Santa Anna is on his way so they must head east in the Runaway Scrape. While they attempt to cross a river Sara suffers from a miscarriage while her young son Little Johnnie dies in Euphemia's arms. Many other young and old Texans die and Euphemia is almost lost in a sea of graves. After a month and a week, Sam Houston defeats Santa Anna's army and Texas is reborn as the Republic of Texas. They now live in a new home with their horses. Their sisters Fannie and Jane Isabella come to live with them after their father dies at sea. They are very different from Sara and Phemie (Annabeth Gish) and must adapt to their new brutal life.

One year later, Sarah survives an encounter with Tarantula (Michael Greyeyes), a Comanche warrior, and his band of Comanches. Later, Euphemia's close friend Matilda "Maddie" Lockhart (Anne Tremko) is abducted by the Comanches and only later released. When given back, the Texans discover that she was brutally tortured, with the right side of her face disfigured by burn scars; the Comanche repeatedly awakened her by placing burning coals on her face. Maddie is bloody and shows signs of beating everywhere. She never fully recovers from her time with the Native Americans.

Euphemia is now sixteen and almost gets attacked by a panther when William King (Matthew Glave), a boy who she dreams about frequently, saves her. They continue to talk every day for the next five years and then get married. Sara's own husband dies in battle, and she gets remarried to a musician. Euphemia has a few children with William while they live happily together with the slave Tildy (Khadijah Karriem). They have a few horses, including one called Dancer. Euphemia meets Tarantula once again at a show (he is one of the actors) and since he is walking far for an old man, she gives him Dancer, her best horse. He gives her the name "Brave Squaw Child". This is the end of Euphemia's life in the book.

Cherokee (Julie Carmen) and Lewis (Michael York) want to leave Georgia because Cherokee is half Creek and they were being driven out. They wanted to leave before they were forced to.

Georgia Lawshe Woods (Angelina Jolie) falls in love at the age of fifteen at Swann Lake when two dogs frighten her and make her fall  and Colonial Doctor Peter Woods (Jeffrey Nordling) tends to her wounds. She finds herself falling in love with this man and they get married the same year. They have four children a few years later and head to Texas. Along the way Georgia has doubts but Peter wants to keep going. They live in Texas for a while but find out the river water is contaminated, which leads to many deaths from cholera. They move again, and Georgia and Euphemia meet when Sam Houston keeps them together. The story then switches to Bettie Moss.

Cast
 Dana Delany as Sarah McClure
 Annabeth Gish as Euphemia Ashby
 Angelina Jolie as Georgia Virginia Lawshe Woods
 Tina Majorino as Young Euphemia Ashby
 Rachael Leigh Cook as Young Georgia Lawshe 
 Michael York as Lewis Lawshe
 Jeffrey Nordling as Dr. Peter Woods
 Salli Richardson-Whitfield as Martha
 Tony Todd as Ed Tom
 Michael Greyeyes as Tarantula
 Anne Tremko as Matilda Lockhart
 Irene Bedard as Tobe 
 Powers Boothe as Bartlett McClure
 Julie Carmen as Cherokee Lawshe
 John Schneider as Sam Houston
 Charles S. Dutton as Josiah
 Matthew Glave as William King
 Khadijah Karriem as Tildy
 Reed Frerichs as Travis McClure
 Miles Fisher as Young Travis McClure
 Mona Lee Fultz as Ester Lockhart
 Terrence Mann as Captain Haller
 Kevin Page as Soldier
 Haylie Duff as Elle (uncredited)
 Hilary Duff as additional role (uncredited)
 Shannon Woodward as Young Cherokee Woods (uncredited)

Awards
 1997 Nominated Primetime Emmy Award for Outstanding Music Composition for a Miniseries or a Special Bruce Broughton (composer)
 1998 Won Lone Star Film & Television Awards for Best Actress —  Dana Delany
 1998 Nominated ALMA Awards for Outstanding Individual Performance in a Made-for-Television Movie or Mini-Series in a Crossover Role — Julie Carmen

References

External links
 
 
 

1997 television films
1997 films
American Civil War films
1997 Western (genre) films
CBS network films
Films scored by Bruce Broughton
Native Americans in popular culture
Texas Revolution films
American Western (genre) television films
Films directed by Karen Arthur
1990s American films
1990s English-language films